Ganesh Lawati (born 1 June 1981) is a footballer from Nepal. He made his first appearance for the Nepal national football team in 2011.
He plays for the departmental team APF Club.

References 

1981 births
Living people
Nepalese footballers
Nepal international footballers
Place of birth missing (living people)
Association football forwards